Quick is the surname of:

People:
 Bob Quick (basketball) (born 1946), retired American basketball player
 Bob Quick (police officer), British police officer
 Brian Quick (born 1989), American football player
 Chris Quick (born 1988), Scottish film editor
 Diana Quick (born 1946), English actress
 Edward Quick (1935-2016), American politician
 Eldon Quick (born 1937), American character actor, an alumnus of the American Shakespeare Festival
 Frederick James Quick (1836—1902), an English coffee merchant and philanthropist 
 Glenys Quick (born 1957), New Zealand long-distance runner
 Harry Quick (born 1941), Australian politician
 Jerry Quick (born 1963), American football player
 Jim Quick (born 1943), Major League Baseball umpire
 John Quick (disambiguation)
 Jonathan Quick (born 1986), American National Hockey League goaltender
 Joseph Quick (Medal of Honor) (1877–1969), United States Navy coxswain awarded the Medal of Honor
 Kevin Quick (born 1988), American ice hockey defenseman
 Mike Quick (born 1959), American retired National Football League player
 Preston Quick (born 1978), American squash player
 Rebecca Quick (born 1972), American television journalist/newscaster
 Richard Quick (1943–2009), American swimming coach
 Robert Hebert Quick (1831–1891), English educator and writer on education
 Simon P. Quick (1850–1927), American lumber businessman, hotelier, and politician
 Terence Quick (born 1947), Greek journalist and politician.
 Thomas Quick (disambiguation)
 Winnifred Quick (1904-2002), one of the last four survivors of the sinking of RMS Titanic in 1912.

Fictional characters:
 Jesse Quick, original name of Jesse Chambers, a DC Comics character
 Johnny Quick, two distinct DC Comics characters
 one of the title characters of Quick & Flupke, a comic book series by Belgian cartoonist Hergé
 Little Miss Quick, a Little Miss character

Other References:
 American slang for Cocaine